is an unnumbered asteroid, classified as a near-Earth object of the Apollo group, approximately 19 meters in diameter. It was first observed by the Siding Spring Survey, Australia, on 15 May 2010. It is known to be the fastest rotator with an unambiguous period solution, having an exceptionally rapid rotation period of less than 25 seconds.

On May 17, 2010, it passed  from Earth. It is on the lower of the Sentry Risk Table.

Earth impact possibility 
 has an Earth minimum orbit intersection distance of 0.45 Lunar Distances However, it only has a 1 in 1,449,000 (0.000069%) chance of impacting into Earth sometime after 2049. Even if it did impact,  is so small that it would simply disintegrate in a manner similar to the Chelyabinsk meteor.

Rotation 
The asteroid was found to have a rapid rotation by the Magdalena Ridge Observatory's 2.4-meter telescope. It rotates at an extremely rapid rate of 24.5 seconds.  is the second fastest natural rotating object discovered in the Solar System, after 2014 RC, which has a period of 16 seconds but still an uncertain period solution.

See also 
List of exceptional asteroids
List of fast rotators (minor planets)

References

External links 
 Asteroid Lightcurve Database (LCDB), query form (info )
 
 
 

Minor planet object articles (unnumbered)

Earth-crossing asteroids
20100517
20100515